Below is a partial list of shows that were previously aired on the Philippine free-to-air television network, A2Z. For the currently aired shows of the network, see the list of programs broadcast by A2Z (Philippine TV channel).

Previous original programs

News and current affairs
 A2Z News Alert 
 Aksyon Time 
 Iba 'Yan! 
 KBYN: Kaagapay ng Bayan 
 Paano Kita Mapasasalamatan?

Drama/Weekly Series
 2 Good 2 Be True 
 A Family Affair 
 Almost Paradise 
 Ang sa Iyo Ay Akin 
 FPJ's Ang Probinsyano 
 Bagong Umaga 
 Bawal Lumabas: The Series 
 Bola Bola 
 The Broken Marriage Vow 
 Click, Like, Share 
 Flower of Evil 
 He's Into Her 
 Hoy, Love You! 
 Huwag Kang Mangamba 
 Init sa Magdamag 
 La Vida Lena 
 Love in 40 Days 
 Lyric and Beat 
 Maalaala Mo Kaya 
 Marry Me, Marry You 
 Mars Ravelo's Darna 
 Run To Me 
 The Goodbye Girl  
 Unloving U 
 Viral Scandal 
 Walang Hanggang Paalam 
 
Re-runs
 Bagani 
 Be My Lady 
 Dolce Amore 
 Love Thy Woman 
 Magpahanggang Wakas 
 Nang Ngumiti ang Langit 
 The Good Son

Reality
 Pinoy Big Brother: Connect 
 Pinoy Big Brother: Kumunity Season 10 
 Your Face Sounds Familiar (season 3)

Game
 Everybody, Sing! (season 1) 
 Everybody, Sing! (season 2) 
 I Can See Your Voice (season 3) 
 I Can See Your Voice (season 4)

Comedy
 My Papa Pi (season 1)

Informative
 Asenso Pinoy 
 Matanglawin

Religious
 Prayer Line 
 Word for the Season 
 Worship, Word and Wonders

Previous acquired programs

Anime series
 Anne of Green Gables 
 The Adventures of Tom Sawyer 
 Cardcaptor Sakura: Clear Card 
 Cedie, Ang Munting Prinsipe 
 Charlotte 
 Dog of Flanders 
 Doraemon 
 Inazuma Eleven GO: Chrono Stone 
 Judy Abbott 
 Legends of Dawn: The Sacred Stone 
 Marco 
 Naruto Shippuden (season 4) 
 Peter Pan and Wendy 
 Princess Sarah 
 Remi, Nobody's Girl 
 The Trapp Family Singers

Cartoons
 Care Bears: Unlock the Magic 
 Masha and the Bear 
 Lego Ninjago 
 Peppa Pig 
 PJ Masks 
 Pororo the Little Penguin 
 Rob the Robot 
 Tayo The Little Bus

Film presentation
 Primetime Zinema 
 Sunday Zine Hits 
 Zine Love 
 Zinema Presents

Foreign drama
 Codename: Terrius 
 Come and Hug Me 
 Count Your Lucky Stars 
 F4 Thailand: Boys Over Flowers 
 Melting Me Softly 
 Meow: The Secret Boy 
 Touch Your Heart

Live-action
 Power Rangers Ninja Steel

Reality 
 Dream Maker: Search For the Next Global Pop Group

Sports
 MPBL

See also 
List of Philippine television shows
List of programs distributed by ABS-CBN
List of programs broadcast by ABS-CBN
List of programs aired by Kapamilya Channel
List of programs aired by Kapamilya Online Live
List of programs aired by TV5 (Philippine TV network)
List of ABS-CBN specials aired

References

ZOE Broadcasting Network
A2Z (Philippine TV channel) original programming
Lists of television series by network
Philippine television-related lists